This is a list of Sheriffs (and after 1 April 1974, High Sheriffs) of Cheshire.

The Sheriff is the oldest secular office under the Crown. Formerly the Sheriff was the principal law enforcement officer in the county but over the centuries most of the responsibilities associated with the post have been transferred elsewhere or are now defunct, so that its functions are now largely ceremonial. Under the provisions of the Local Government Act 1972, on 1 April 1974 the office previously known as Sheriff was retitled High Sheriff. The High Sheriff is appointed annually, taking office in March. As of 2022, the High Sheriff of Cheshire is Jeannie France-Hayhurst.

List of Sheriffs of Cheshire

 c.1151: Ranulph
 c.1184: Gilbert Pipard or de Arden
 c.1185–1187: Bertram de Verdon
 1189: Richard de Pierpoint
 1199: Lidulph de Twemlow

1200–1399

1400–1499

1500–1599

1600–1699

1700–1799

1800–1899

1900–1973

List of High Sheriffs of Cheshire

1974–1999

2000–present

See also

  County Palatine of Cheshire

References

Further reading
 
 (with amendments of 1963, Public Record Office)

External links
 The High Sheriffs' Association of England & Wales: Cheshire
 High Sheriff of Cheshire

 
Cheshire
Local government in Cheshire
Cheshire-related lists